Czarni Słupsk, more commonly known as Grupa Sierleccy Czarni Słupsk because of sponsorship reasons, is a Polish basketball team, based in Słupsk, playing in Polish Basketball League (PLK).  The home arena of the club was Hala Gryfia.

History
In July 1945, the original Czarni Słupsk team was formed, by railway workers who moved from Krakow to Słupsk after World War II. The club was originated as an association football club, but in 1989 the basketball section was founded. In the 1998–99 season, the team promoted to the Polish Basketball League (PLK). In the 2005–06 season, the first club honour was one: the bronze medal. In the 2010s Czarni Słupsk was a steady competitor in the PLK, with several Playoff appearances.

On 31 January 2018, Czarni Słupsk retired from the league and was dissolved due to financial collapse.

In 2018, it was decided to re-start basketball activities for the club and before 2021–22 season, they promoted to PLK, first-tier of Polish basketball system.

Players

Current roster

Notable players

Season by season

Logos

Honours
 Polish Basketball League:
Third place (4): 2005–06, 2010–11, 2014–15, 2015–16

References

Basketball teams in Poland
Sport in Słupsk
Basketball teams established in 1989
Basketball teams disestablished in 2018
Sport in Pomeranian Voivodeship